Charles Thomas Reece (born 8 September 1988), is an English former footballer who played as a midfielder and is now a Business Development Manager at TripleFast Middle East Ltd.

Career
Born in Birmingham, West Midlands, Reece played for Aston Villa as a youth but was not awarded a scholarship with them. Upon being released he was a member of the Bristol Rovers youth team, based at the Bristol Academy of Sport until being awarded his first professional contract in the summer of 2007. He made his first-team debut in a Football League game against Carlisle United on 29 December 2007, when he came on as a substitute for Sammy Igoe late in the game.

He joined Solihull Moors on a month-long loan during the 2008–09 season. On the final day of the 2008-09 season, he was given his first ever Rovers start against Hartlepool. After an exceptional performance, Reece was awarded Man of the Match. In the 2010-11 season, Reece finally got starting into the squad, after an impressive display after coming on during the 2 - 1 defeat to Swindon. However, he has gone from central midfield, onto the right, as he believes doing this will make him more likely to get into the squad.

During the pre-season of 2011-12 new manager Paul Buckle informed Reece he would not be featuring in his plans and would be allowed to leave Bristol Rovers on a free transfer. On 20 October. 2011, Reece joined Gloucester City on loan.

Reece joined Conference National side Tamworth on 30 January 2012 on a monthlong loan deal.

References

External links

1989 births
Living people
Footballers from Birmingham, West Midlands
English footballers
Association football midfielders
Aston Villa F.C. players
Bristol Rovers F.C. players
Solihull Moors F.C. players
Gloucester City A.F.C. players
Tamworth F.C. players
Worcester City F.C. players
English Football League players
National League (English football) players